Raja Laut is a two masted gaff rigged wooden schooner. Built in 2006, her hull and rigging are based on the designs of traditional European yachts and small trading ships of the 19th century.

Design
The hull design is typical of traditional wooden schooners from Europe and America. The hull of Raja Laut was built of hard and resistant timber, a type of ironwood known as Belian or Ulin, forming a strong and watertight hull, with all fastening in '304' stainless steel. Emphasis on timber quality and symmetry of construction mean the hull lines provide for a smooth flow of water and excellent stability.

Name
The Malay name Raja Laut, translates to "King of the Sea", is a reference to the history and maritime adventure stories of Joseph Conrad and the Malay Archipelago, South East Asia.

Luxury charter
Raja Laut is part of a number of sail charters that operates around the Asia-Pacific region. The vessel has only six cabins, with a maximum of 12 passengers. In January 2011, Raja Laut was involved in a more unusual charter when she was hired as one of the sets for the making of a feature film about 50 German World War One marines left stranded by the light cruiser  during the Battle of Cocos. The film was being made by the veteran filmmaker Berengar Pfahl.

See also 
List of schooners

References

External links

Individual sailing yachts
Ships built in Malaysia